Joseph Steven Davis (born 10 November 1993) is an English former professional footballer who played as a centre back.

Davis is son of professional manager Steve Davis and brother of Harry Davis. He came through the Port Vale Academy and played a minor role as the club secured promotion out of League Two in the 2012–13 season. He left Port Vale to join Leicester City in June 2014. He was loaned out to Fleetwood Town in October 2015 before joining the club permanently three months later. He re-signed with Port Vale in June 2017 and was loaned out to York City in November 2018. He left Port Vale for Nantwich Town in March 2019, before retiring in June 2020 so as to pursue a career in the media.

Career

Port Vale
Davis started his career in the youth ranks at Port Vale in 2002. Described as a "natural born leader", he was handed a squad number for the 2010–11 season, making the first-team bench in October 2010. This came a month after a highly impressive reserve-team performance against Sheffield Wednesday. His debut came on 30 April 2011, as he came on as a substitute to replace Gareth Owen seventy minutes into a 7–2 home win over Morecambe.

The 2011–12 season was the final year of his youth contract. He made his second appearance at senior level on 17 March, when he replaced Paul Marshall 49 minutes into a 3–2 defeat away to Crawley Town; manager Micky Adams put him on as centre-back Clayton McDonald had just been sent off. McDonald's subsequent suspension gave Davis the opportunity to start against Hereford United three days later, Adams saying "he'll either sink or swim". He was voted man of the match after he produced "a disciplined defensive display beyond his tender years". However, he was sent off 69 minutes into the next match for a professional foul on Torquay United's Rene Howe; the penalty kick was converted to cost Vale a 2–1 away defeat. With Clayton McDonald facing legal issues, Davis was given an extended run in the team towards the end of the 2011–12 season, thus securing the 18-year-old apprentice his first professional contract. At the end of the season he was given both the club's Youth and Young Player of the Year awards. He announced his intention to accept the club's offer of a new two-year contract in June 2012. Despite being one of the last of the 16 players offered contracts to commit his future to the club, Micky Adams said that the deal was "never in doubt" and told the media of the "excellent potential" he saw in the young defender.

Davis started the opening match of the 2012–13 season, a 3–1 home defeat to Burnley in the League Cup, but was substituted at half-time following a mistimed back-pass that allowed Charlie Austin to score for Burnley. His replacement, Clayton McDonald, then formed an impressive partnership with John McCombe to leave Davis on the sidelines. Facing Northampton Town away on 27 October, Gareth Owen filled the gap left after McDonald picked up a one-match suspension, but was replaced by Davis at half-time after picking up an injury; McCombe was also sent-off in the match, leaving Davis to cope adequately at centre back alongside fellow teenager Kingsley James. Vale secured promotion at the end of the season with a third-place finish, though Davis featured on only ten occasions.

Having failed to make an appearance for Port Vale at the start of the 2013–14 season, he was loaned out to Conference Premier club Luton Town in November 2013. He played nine times for Luton, with the club winning seven and drawing two matches with Davis in the team. Luton manager John Still requested an extension to the loan but Micky Adams recalled Davis to provide cover for the injured Richard Duffy. On 11 January an injury crisis meant that he started in an inexperienced centre-back partnership with 19-year-old Jack Grimmer as Vale lost 2–0 away to league leaders Brentford. He was publicly praised by Adams for his performance in the match, and Davis told the Sentinel that "I'm hoping to cement my place and get myself going again." He earned a place on the Football League team of the week for his performance as "a commanding figure" in a 0–0 draw at Shrewsbury Town on 15 February.

Leicester City and Fleetwood Town
On 30 June 2014, Davis signed for Premier League club Leicester City, who placed him in their development squad.

He joined League One club Fleetwood Town on 3 October 2015 on a one-month loan, alongside Stoke City centre-back Dionatan Teixeira, following an injury crisis at the club. After impressing on his loan spell, Davis signed for Fleetwood permanently on 11 January 2016 on a contract of undisclosed length for an undisclosed fee. He ended the 2015–16 season with 25 appearances to his name as Fleetwood posted a 19th-place finish, but played just eight times throughout the 2016–17 season.

Return to Port Vale
Davis negotiated his release from Fleetwood to re-sign for Port Vale, now in League Two, on 21 June 2017 on a two-year contract. Manager Michael Brown said that "Hopefully 'Morgs' will get into him early in pre-season and we will see if we can develop a footballer. He has good pedigree and we will see where that one can go." He picked up a thigh injury in September and was ruled out of action for three months, before he was recalled to the first team by new manager Neil Aspin in December to replace the suspended James Gibbons at right back. He was transfer-listed at the end of the 2017–18 season.

He joined National League North club York City on 9 November 2018 on a short-term loan. He made his debut the following day, starting in a 2–1 defeat away to Swindon Town in the FA Cup first round. He returned to Vale on 11 January 2019 having made 10 appearances for York. New manager John Askey agreed a deal to release him from his contract early on 1 March.

Nantwich Town
Davis joined Northern Premier League Premier Division club Nantwich Town in March 2019. He won the Cheshire Senior Cup with the club after playing in the 5–2 victory over Cammell Laird 1907 in the final. He also helped Nantwich to reach the play-offs, where they were beaten by Warrington Town in the semi-final. The 2019–20 season was formally abandoned on 26 March 2020 due to the COVID-19 pandemic, with Nantwich sixth in the table.

Style of play
Elder brother Harry described him as "a tough tackler... he'll put his head in anywhere". Defensive partner at Port Vale John McCombe added that "he's aggressive and reads the game well." Port Vale teammate Tom Pope added that Davis is calm in possession and technically sound.

Personal life
Davis was born in Burnley, Lancashire. His father is former Crewe Alexandra manager Steve Davis, and his elder brother Harry played for Crewe, but is now at AFC Fylde – all three family members are defenders. On 22 February 2014, for 33 minutes of a match at Port Vale, Harry and Joe Davis played on opposite teams against each other, while their father watched as manager of Crewe. Joe later stated that the experience had a negative psychological effect on him and also recalled that manager Micky Adams had previously banned him from the training ground in games against Crewe so that he wouldn't divulge tactics to his father. By June 2020, he was studying for a degree in Sports Writing and Broadcasting at Staffordshire University and writing a column in the Blackpool Gazette.

Career statistics

Honours
Nantwich Town
Cheshire Senior Cup: 2018–19

References

1993 births
Living people
Footballers from Burnley
English footballers
Association football defenders
Port Vale F.C. players
Luton Town F.C. players
Leicester City F.C. players
Fleetwood Town F.C. players
York City F.C. players
Nantwich Town F.C. players
English Football League players
National League (English football) players
Northern Premier League players
English columnists
Alumni of Staffordshire University